Pull My Chain is the sixth studio album by American country music artist Toby Keith. It was released on August 28, 2001 by DreamWorks Records. The album has been certified 2× Multi-Platinum in the U.S. for sales of two million copies. All three of this album's singles — "I'm Just Talkin' About Tonight", "I Wanna Talk About Me", and "My List" — were Number One hits on the Hot Country Songs charts between 2001 and 2002. Also included here is the track "I Can't Take You Anywhere", which was released by its co-writer, Scotty Emerick, as a single in 2003. The album was  dedicated to his father Hubert Keith (H.K.) Covel, who died in March 2001.

Track listing

Personnel

Eddie Bayers – drums ("Gimme 8 Seconds")
Mike Brignardello – bass guitar
Scotty Emerick – background vocals ("I Can't Take You Anywhere"), acoustic guitar ("Tryin' to Matter")
Paul Franklin – steel guitar
Clayton Ivey – piano
Toby Keith – lead vocals
Brent Mason – electric guitar
Steve Nathan – keyboards
John Robinson – drums (all tracks except "Gimme 8 Seconds")
Brent Rowan – electric guitar
Biff Watson – acoustic guitar
Curtis Wright – background vocals
Curtis Young – background vocals

Charts

Weekly charts

Year-end charts

References

2001 albums
Toby Keith albums
DreamWorks Records albums
Albums produced by James Stroud
Albums produced by Toby Keith